Damian Lazarus is a DJ and electronic music producer. He released his first album Smoke the Monster Out in May 2009, after two years of writing content for it.

Discography

Albums
Smoke the Monster Out, 2009.
Fabric 54, 	Fabric, 2010.
Flourish, 2020
Beijing Spring (Music Inspired by The Film), 2022

References

Electronic dance music DJs
Progressive house musicians
Remixers
Year of birth missing (living people)
Living people